Big Four is an unincorporated community located in McDowell County, West Virginia, United States. Their post office  has been closed. Originally known as Cirrus, Big Four is reported to have been renamed for the four men who operated the coal mines in the area.

References

Unincorporated communities in McDowell County, West Virginia
Unincorporated communities in West Virginia
Coal towns in West Virginia